Hypericum caprifolium is a perennial herb in the family Hypericaceae. It is the type species of subsect. Caprifolia in the section Adenosepalum.

References 

caprifolium